The Tea Research and Extension Station (TRES) is the research and development center of Taiwan tea where scientists and tea masters conduct study, research and experiment to improve tea plantations, to develop new and better cultivars, to manufacture and educate the industry and consumers in Taiwan. It is located on a  site in Yangmei District, a region in which the slightly acidic soil not well suited for other agriculture has seen tea become a major crop. It is the only professional institution for the study and testing of tea in Taiwan, and is affiliated to the governmental Council of Agriculture.

History
The center was originally established in 1903 as Tea Manufacture Experiment Station. In 1968, it was reorganized as Taiwan Tea Experiment Station. In 1999, it was reorganized again as Taiwan Tea Experiment Station. In 2003, it was renamed to Tea Research and Extension Station. The station has developed hybrid tea varieties such as Taiwan Tea No. 18 to boost Taiwanese black tea production

Organizational structures

Divisions
 Departments of Tea Agronomy
 Tea Manufacture
 Tea Machinery
 Tea Extension
 Tunding Branch

Offices
 Offices of Secretary
 Personnel Affairs
 Accounting

See also
 Council of Agriculture (Taiwan)
 Taiwanese tea
 Tatung Institute of Commerce and Technology
 Pinglin Tea Industry Museum
 Taiwan Banana Research Institute
 Taiwan Sugar Research Institute

References

Further reading

External links
 Official site (English)
 Official site (Chinese)

Agricultural research institutes in Taiwan
Taiwanese tea